Geological Observations on the Volcanic Islands, visited during the Voyage of H.M.S. Beagle is a book written by the English naturalist Charles Darwin.  The book was published in 1844, and is based on his travels during the second voyage of HMS Beagle, commanded by captain Robert FitzRoy. It is the second book in a series of geology books written by Darwin that also includes The Structure and Distribution of Coral Reefs (published in 1842) and Geological Observations on South America (published in 1846).

The text contains seven chapters, and includes observations made during Darwin's travels to the volcanic island of St. Jago in Cape Verde, the Fernando de Noronha archipelago, Ascension Island, the island of Saint Helena, the Galápagos Islands, James Island, New Zealand, Australia, Van Diemen's Land, and the Cape of Good Hope.

The book includes one of the earliest accounts of the process of magmatic differentiation. While observing a basaltic lava flow in the Galápagos Islands, Darwin observed that "crystals sink from their weight" and that this "throws light on the separation of the high silica versus low silica series of rocks." This was the first proposal of the fractional crystallization hypothesis of magma differentiation that was further developed and demonstrated in the 20th century. 

The geologist Archibald Geikie praised the book, calling it "the best authority on the general geological structure of most of the regions it describes," and that Darwin was "one of the earliest writers to recognize the magnitude of denudation to which even recent geological accumulations have been subjected." 

A second edition of the book, published in 1876, combines Geological Observations on the Volcanic Islands with Geological Observations on South America.

References

External links
 Geological Observations on the Volcanic Islands at Project Gutenberg

Notes

1844 books
Books by Charles Darwin
Geology books